The 1904 Ohio Northern football team was an American football team that represented Ohio Northern University during the 1904 college football season. The team compiled a 7–2–1 record and outscored opponents by a total of 471 to 98. The team averaged nearly 50 points per game but was shut out by Michigan.

Schedule

References

Ohio Northern
Ohio Northern Polar Bears football seasons
Ohio Northern football